Kristine Moldestad (born 10 April 1969) is a Norwegian handball player who played for the club Larvik HK and the Norwegian national team in the 1990s. She was born in Bærum. She competed at the 1996 Summer Olympics in Atlanta, where the Norwegian team finished fourth.

References

External links

1969 births
Living people
Sportspeople from Bærum
Norwegian female handball players
Handball players at the 1996 Summer Olympics
Olympic handball players of Norway